Thryptomene shirleyae is a shrub species in the family Myrtaceae that is endemic to Western Australia.

The shrub is found in a small area the Wheatbelt region of Western Australia between Carnamah and Dalwallinu.

References

shirleyae
Endemic flora of Western Australia
Rosids of Western Australia
Vulnerable flora of Australia
Plants described in 2014
Taxa named by Barbara Lynette Rye